The  was held on 3 February 1985 in Kanagawa Prefectural Music Hall, Yokohama, Kanagawa, Japan.

Awards
 Best Film: Mahjong hōrōki
 Best Actor: Takeshi Kaga – Mahjong hōrōki
 Best Actress: Mari Shirato – Mermaid Legend
 Best New Actress:
Yasuko Tomita – Aiko 16 sai
Youki Kudoh – The Crazy Family
Kimiko Yoshimiya – Renzoku Satsujinki: Reiketsu
 Best Supporting Actor: Kaku Takashina – Mahjong hōrōki
 Best Supporting Actress:
Kin Sugai –  The Funeral
Etsuko Shihomi – Shanghai bansu kingu
 Best Director: Toshiharu Ikeda – Mermaid Legend
 Best New Director: Shūsuke Kaneko – Kōichirō Uno's Wet and Swinging, OL Yurizoku 19-sai, Eve-chan-no hime
 Best Screenplay: Juzo Itami – The Funeral
 Best Cinematography: Yonezo Maeda – The Funeral, Mermaid Legend, Tokimeki ni Shisu,  Main Theme
 Special Prize:
Norifumi Suzuki (Career)
Sayuri Yoshinaga (Career)

Best 10
 Mahjong hōrōki
 The Funeral
 Nausicaä of the Valley of the Wind
 Mermaid Legend
 Chinpira
 MacArthur's Children
 Saraba Hakobune
 The Crazy Family
 Tokimeki ni Shisu
 Sukanpin Walk
runner-up. Urusei Yatsura 2: Beautiful Dreamer

References

Yokohama Film Festival
Yokohama Film Festival
Yokohama Film Festival
Yokohama Film Festival